Kosei Tano (born 22 January 1914, date of death unknown) was a Japanese water polo player. He competed in the men's tournament at the 1936 Summer Olympics.

References

External links
 

1914 births
Year of death missing
Place of birth missing
Japanese male water polo players
Olympic water polo players of Japan
Water polo players at the 1936 Summer Olympics